Flordelis – Basta uma Palavra para Mudar (English: "Flordelis – A word suffices to change") is a 2009 Brazilian film based on the life of gospel singer and politician Flordelis.

Plot 
Based on a true story, the film depicts the life of Flordelis, an evangelical resident of the Jacarezinho slum in Rio de Janeiro, who adopted 37 children and has faced various challenges.

Cast 
Bruna Marquezine as Rayane
Reynaldo Gianecchini
Letícia Sabatella
Patrícia França
Deborah Secco
Marcello Antony as Anderson do Carmo
Letícia Spiller
Cauã Reymond
Alinne Moraes
Fernanda Lima
Rodrigo Hilbert
Ana Furtado
Fernanda Machado
Sérgio Marone
Giselle Itié
Thiago Martins
Carolina Oliveira
Júlia Mattos
Graziella Schmitt
Guilherme Berenguer
Pedro Neschling
Thiago Rodrigues
Cris Vianna
Isabel Fillardis
Alexandre Zacchia
Eduardo Galvão
Roumer Canhães
Erik Marmo
Raphael Louzada

References

External links
 

2009 films
Brazilian biographical drama films
2000s Portuguese-language films